Las Vegas is an American television series that aired on NBC from September 22, 2003 to February 15, 2008. It focuses on a team of people working in the fictional Montecito Resort and Casino in Las Vegas, Nevada dealing with issues that arise within the working environment, ranging from valet parking and restaurant management to casino security. The series originally aired on Monday nights, though NBC moved the series to Friday nights in 2006. The show is currently in syndication and airs in the United States on USA Network.

Las Vegas ran for five years, a total of 106 episodes aired over 5 seasons. In the final season, only 19 episodes of the originally-planned 22-episode season were filmed at the time the show was cancelled in 2008. The final episode ended with a cliffhanger with many issues left unresolved.

Series overview

Episodes

Season 1 (2003–04)

Season 2 (2004–05)

Season 3 (2005–06)

Season 4 (2006–07)

Season 5 (2007–08)

Notes

References

External links 
 
 

Lists of American comedy-drama television series episodes

it:Las Vegas (serie televisiva)#Episodi